Dubova may refer to:

Dubová (disambiguation), multiple places in western Slovakia
Dubova, Ukraine, a village in Ukraine
Dubova, the Romanian name for Dubove village, Mikhalcha Commune, Storozhynets Raion, Ukraine
Dubova, Mehedinți, a commune in Romania
Dubova Colonorum, a volunteer camp aiming to restore the ruins of a medieval church in Slovakia

See also
 Dubovo (disambiguation)